The 1902 Pittsburgh Pirates won a second straight National League pennant, by an overwhelming 27.5 game margin over the Brooklyn Superbas. It was the Pirates' first ever 100-win team, and still holds the franchise record for best winning percentage at home (.789). The team finished with a league-best record of 103-36. 

Ginger Beaumont won the batting title with a .357 mark, Tommy Leach led the league in home runs with 6  (a major league record for fewest HRs to lead the league), Honus Wagner led the league in RBI with 91, and Jack Chesbro led the league with 28 wins. As a team, the Pirates led the league in every significant batting category, the last time that has been done in the NL. They scored 775 runs, which was 142 more than any other team.  

The team allowed four home runs during their 1902 season, the fewest in MLB history.

Regular season

Season standings

Record vs. opponents

Opening Day lineup

Roster

Player stats

Batting

Starters by position 
Note: Pos = Position; G = Games played; AB = At bats; H = Hits; Avg. = Batting average; HR = Home runs; RBI = Runs batted in

Other batters 
Note: G = Games played; AB = At bats; H = Hits; Avg. = Batting average; HR = Home runs; RBI = Runs batted in

Pitching

Starting pitchers 
Note: G = Games pitched; IP = Innings pitched; W = Wins; L = Losses; ERA = Earned run average; SO = Strikeouts

Relief pitchers 
Note: G = Games pitched; W = Wins; L = Losses; SV = Saves; ERA = Earned run average; SO = Strikeouts

Awards and honors

League top five finishers 
Ginger Beaumont
 NL leader in batting average (.357)
 #3 in NL in runs scored (100)
 #3 in NL in on-base percentage (.404)
 #4 in NL in stolen bases (33)

Jack Chesbro
 NL leader in wins (28)

Fred Clarke
 #2 in NL in runs scored (103)
 #3 in NL in slugging percentage (.449)
 #4 in NL in on-base percentage (.401)

Tommy Leach
 NL leader in home runs (6)
 #2 in NL in RBI (85)
 #4 in NL in runs scored (97)

Jesse Tannehill
 #3 in NL in ERA (1.95)

Honus Wagner
 NL leader in RBI (91)
 NL leader in runs scored (105)
 NL leader in stolen bases (42)
 NL leader in slugging percentage (.463)

Notes

References

External links
 1902 Pittsburgh Pirates team page at Baseball Reference
 1902 Pittsburgh Pirates Page at Baseball Almanac

Pittsburgh Pirates seasons
Pittsburgh Pirates season
National League champion seasons
1900s in Pittsburgh
Pittsburg Pir